BowelScreen, BreastCheck and CervicalCheck are cancer screening programmes organised by the Health Service Executive (HSE) in the Republic of Ireland.

BowelScreen

BowelScreen is the national bowel cancer screening programme. It was launched in November 2012 by Minister for Health James Reilly, with the eventual aim of providing bi-annual screening to men and women aged 55–74.

BreastCheck

BreastCheck is the national breast cancer screening programme. It was initially founded under Micheál Martin's tenure as Minister for Health and Children in October 2000 as a pilot in a limited number of health boards. Over 70% of the women invited to take part in the screening in the first year, accepted.

CervicalCheck
CervicalCheck is the national cervical screening programme. It was launched in September 2008 as the public name of the National Cancer Screening Service. In May 2008, then Chief Executive Officer Tony O'Brien dismissed claims that misdiagnoses would result from the use of US-based lab Quest Diagnostics.

2018

On 26 April 2018, the HSE confirmed that 206 women developed cervical cancer after having a screening test which was subsequently deemed to be potentially inaccurate on lookback, once a woman presented with a confirmed diagnosis of Cervical Cancer and given the known limitations of screening using smear technology. In May, HSE director-general Tony O’Brien took temporary leave of absence from the board of a US medical company amid renewed calls for him to stand aside from his position due to the ongoing controversy. Tony O'Brien announced his resignation as director-general of the HSE with effect from close of business on 11 May.

References

Cancer screening
Healthcare in the Republic of Ireland